Oshnavieh County (Kurdish: 'اشنۆ'شنۆ'شنه‌) is in West Azerbaijan province, Iran. The capital of the county is the city of Oshnavieh. At the 2006 census, the county's population was 63,798 in 12,998 households. The following census in 2011 counted 70,030 people in 17,778 households. At the 2016 census, the county's population was 73,886 in 19,336 households.

The county lies west of Lake Urmia about 1,300 metres above sea level, on the border with the Kurdish provinces of Iraq. The county is surrounded by high mountains which remain cool even at the height of summer.

History
During Iran-Iraq war, Ba'athist Iraq regime bombarded some parts of Oshnavieh in West Azerbaijan Province (on 2 August 1988) by Chemical bombs; and about 2700 persons were injured as a result of that.

Administrative divisions

The population history of Oshnavieh County's administrative divisions over three consecutive censuses is shown in the following table. The latest census shows two districts, four rural districts, and two cities.

References

 

Counties of West Azerbaijan Province